Savolax (Savo) is the Swedish language name of a geographical region in Finland which can refer to:

Savolax - a historical Province of Sweden
Norra Savolax landskap - a current Region of Finland
Södra Savolax landskap - a current Region of Finland
Eastern Finland -Province of Finland 1997-2010